Maarten Paes (born 14 May 1998) is an Indonesian-Dutch football player who plays as a goalkeeper for Major League Soccer club FC Dallas.

Club career
In the 2017–18 season, he served as a backup goalkeeper to Joris Delle at NEC

On 4 April 2018, he signed with Utrecht on a three-year contract with an option for fourth year.

He made his Eredivisie debut for Utrecht on 19 August 2018 against PEC Zwolle.

On 20 January 2022, Paes joined MLS side FC Dallas on a six-month loan. On 24 June 2022, Dallas exercised the option to make the transfer permanent.

International
He was a member of the Netherlands U19 squads for both 2016 UEFA European Under-19 Championship and 2017 UEFA European Under-19 Championship, but did not appear in any games, serving as backup to Yanick van Osch and Justin Bijlow respectively.

References

External links
 
 Career stats & Profile - Voetbal International

1998 births
Footballers from Nijmegen
Living people
Dutch footballers
Netherlands under-21 international footballers
Netherlands youth international footballers
Association football goalkeepers
NEC Nijmegen players
FC Utrecht players
Jong FC Utrecht players
Eredivisie players
Eerste Divisie players
FC Dallas players
Dutch expatriate footballers
Expatriate soccer players in the United States
Dutch expatriate sportspeople in the United States
Major League Soccer players